Valherbasse is a commune in the Drôme department in southeastern France. It was established on 1 January 2019 by merger of the former communes of Montrigaud (the seat), Miribel and Saint-Bonnet-de-Valclérieux.

See also
Communes of the Drôme department

References

Communes of Drôme

Communes nouvelles of Drôme
Populated places established in 2019
2019 establishments in France